Lindsay Davenport was the defending champion and successfully defended her title by defeating Silvia Farina Elia 7–5, 7–5 in the final.

Seeds
The top eight seeds receive a bye into the second round.

Draw

Finals

Top half

Section 1

Section 2

Bottom half

Section 3

Section 4

External links
 ITF tournament edition details

Bausch and Lomb Championships - Singles
Singles